Horntown may refer to:

Horntown, Kentucky, a community in Russell County
Horntown, Oklahoma, a town in Hughes County
Horntown, Virginia, a CDP in Accomack County